Moraskhun-e Olya (also Romanized as Morāskhūn-e ‘Olyā; also known as Morāskhūn-e Bālā, Morāz Khān, Morāzkhān-e ‘Olyā, and Murāz Khān) is a village in Rostam-e Seh Rural District, Sorna District, Rostam County, Fars Province, Iran. At the 2016 census, its population was 562, in 160 families.

References 

Populated places in Rostam County